The 2005 European Sevens Championship was a rugby sevens competition, with the final held in Moscow, Russia. It was the fourth edition of the European Sevens championship. The event was organised by rugby's European governing body, the FIRA – Association of European Rugby (FIRA-AER).

Final:
Portugal, 28 - Russia, 22

Final standings

References

External links

2002
International rugby union competitions hosted by Russia
European
2005–06 in European rugby union
2005 in Russian rugby union